Within the politics of Scotland, the 1995 elections to North Ayrshire Council were held on 6 April 1995 and were the first for the newly formed Unitary authority for North Ayrshire Council, which was created under the Local Government etc (Scotland) Act 1994.

Election results

Party performance
Labour performed very well and continued control of its majority.

Changes since last election

Ward results
All wards returned Labour councillors except for Wards 27 (Largs South) and Ward 28 (Largs Central & Cumbrae), which returned a Conservative and SNP councillor respectively.

Ward 14 (Stevenston North) didn't hold an election due to the death of a candidate. The by-election was held at a later date, with a Labour Councillor being returned. The results from that ward are excluded from the breakdown above.

References

External links

1995 Scottish local elections
1995